Gordon Wagner (1915–1987) was an American artist.  He was born and raised in Redondo Beach, California.

Wagner became an orphan at a young age.  He received a degree from the University of California, Los Angeles.  He worked in the Aerospace industry as a mechanical engineer.

Sources

External links
UCLA Oral History Library, Interview with Gordon Wagner
Online Archive of California
Biographical Sketch
Biographical from the Getty site

1915 births
1987 deaths
People from Redondo Beach, California
UCLA Henry Samueli School of Engineering and Applied Science alumni
Engineers from California
20th-century American engineers